Facing Fear is a 2013 documentary film by Jason Cohen.

Facing Fear was a nominee for the 86th Academy Awards in the Best Documentary Short Subject category.

References

External links
 
 

2013 LGBT-related films
2013 films
Documentary films about violence against LGBT people
Documentary films about reconciliation
2013 short documentary films
Documentary films about gay men